Daniel Tarbox Jewett (September 14, 1807October 7, 1906) was a United States senator from Missouri in 1870 and 1871. Born in Pittston, Maine, he completed preparatory studies, attended Colby College, graduated from Columbia College in New York in 1830 and from the Harvard Law School. He was admitted to the bar and practiced in Bangor, Maine; he was city solicitor from 1834 to 1837. From 1850 to 1853 he engaged with his brother in operating a steamboat line upon the Chagres River, Isthmus of Panama. He moved to California and engaged in gold mining for two years, after which he returned to Bangor and practiced law.

In 1857 he moved to St. Louis, Missouri and continued the practice of law; in 1866 he was a member of the Missouri House of Representatives. Jewett was appointed as a Republican to the U.S. Senate to fill the vacancy caused by the resignation of Charles D. Drake and served from December 19, 1870, to January 20, 1871, when a successor was elected. He declined to be a candidate for election to the Senate to fill this vacancy and resumed the practice of law.

Jewett died in St. Louis in 1906, and was buried at Bellefontaine Cemetery.

References

1807 births
1906 deaths
Republican Party members of the Missouri House of Representatives
Maine lawyers
Missouri lawyers
City and town attorneys in the United States
American businesspeople
Colby College alumni
Columbia College (New York) alumni
Harvard Law School alumni
Politicians from Bangor, Maine
Politicians from St. Louis
Republican Party United States senators from Missouri
People from Pittston, Maine